The Klang Gates Quartz Ridge is a quartz dyke that runs through northeast of Kuala Lumpur and the state of Selangor, Malaysia within Bukit Lagong-Kanching-Klang Gates region. With the dimension of more than 14 km long and 200 m wide, it is the longest quartz formation in the world. The other major quartz vein in Kuala Lumpur is along Kajang-Cheras road, which is about 8 km long, however the Klang Gates Quartz Ridge is one-of-its-kind because it has four types of quartz formation. The area has five endemic plants species among 265 species, found nowhere else in the world. A rare animal, the serow is found here as well.

Despite being one of the most unusual geological formations in Malaysia, the Klang Gates Quartz Ridge has little conservation and currently being threatened by urban development. More recently, the proposed East Klang Valley Expressway became the latest threat towards the Klang Gates Quartz Ridge, as the expressway alignment may pass through the quartz strip.


Bukit Tabur

Bukit Tabur is a prominent part of the ridge and can be seen from the Kuala Lumpur Middle Ring Road 2. Located in Hulu Gombak Forest Reserve, it is also known locally as Bukit Hangus, Dragon's Back and Crystal Hill. The quartz ridge  Hikers enter the trail near Kampung Klang Gates, 50 metres from the gates of the Klang Gates Dam, at the back of Taman Melawati for a 3-4 hour climb. The peak offers view of the dam and panoramic views of Kuala Lumpur from the north. Several endemic species of plant such as Aleisanthia rupestris are known to grow here.

Access to most parts of Bukit Tabur requires a permit from the Selangor Forestry Department.

Bukit Tabur is divided into the eastern and western section by the dam, with four discrete trails: Bukit Tabur West, Bukit Tabur East, Bukit Tabur Far East and Bukit Tabur Extreme.

There has been a series of accidents on the trail including several fatal mishaps. As a result the trail has been closed at times by the Selangor Forestry Department.

See also
 Geography of Malaysia
 List of tourist attractions in Selangor

References

External links 
 Endemicguides to Bukit Tabur
 Safety tips for first-time hikers
 Ill-fated hill

Geography of Malaysia
Nature sites of Selangor